The Ultimate Collection is the fourth compilation box set by American country music singer-songwriter Garth Brooks, released by Pearl Records, through the distributor Target on November 11, 2016.

Content
The Ultimate Collection includes nine discs of Brooks' previously released material with several previously unreleased tracks included. The set is arranged in thematic playlists, according to Brooks.

The collection's tenth disc is a Target-exclusive copy of Brooks's upcoming tenth studio album Gunslinger, with several Target exclusive tracks. "Baby, Let's Lay Down and Dance" was released as the first single from Gunslinger on October 13, 2016.

Commercial performance
The box set  sold 134,000 copies in the United States in the first week. However, due to its price per disc falling below Billboards minimum required price, the box set was deemed ineligible to chart for its first four weeks on the Billboard 200.  It was the top-selling album of the week, and would have ranked No. 2 on Billboard 200 if it had been eligible to chart. Brooks' Christmas album with his wife Trisha Yearwood, Christmas Together, was released in the same week and debuted at number 11 with 21,000 units.

It later debuted at number 13 on the Billboard 200 in the chart dated December 31, 2016, and number one on the Country Albums chart. The following week, it peaked at number 6 on the Billboard 200. The album has sold 554,200 copies in the United States as of December 2017.

Track listing

Charts

Weekly charts

Year-end charts

References

2016 compilation albums
Garth Brooks compilation albums